Perri is a surname. Notable people with the name include:

 Christina Perri, American singer
 Dan Perri, American film titles designer
 Dominic Perri, Canadian politician
 Fortunato N. Perri Jr., attorney
 Jack Perri (born 1975), men's basketball head coach
 Leslie Perri (died 1970), American science fiction fan, writer and illustrator
 Lucas Perri (born 1997), Brazilian professional footballer
 Nick Perri, guitarist
 Oreste Perri (born 1951), Italian sprint canoer and politician
 Paul Perri, Canadian-American actor
 Rocco Perri (1887–1944), organized crime figure
 Sandro Perri, Canadian rock and electronic musician

See also
 Parri, given name and surname
 Peri (name), given name and surname
 Porri (surname)
 Perri (disambiguation)
 Perry (surname)

Italian-language surnames